Abraham Valentine Williams Jackson, L.H.D., Ph.D., LL.D. (February 9, 1862 – August 8, 1937) was an American specialist on Indo-European languages.

Biography

He was born in New York City on February 9, 1862. He graduated from Columbia University in 1883. He was a fellow in letters there from 1883 to 1886, and an instructor in Anglo-Saxon and the Iranian languages from 1887 to 1890. After studying at the University of Halle from 1887 to 1889 he became an adjunct professor of English language and literature. In 1895, he was appointed public lecturer and also appointed to the newly founded professorship of Indo-Iranian languages at Columbia University, where he remained until 1935.

He was well known as a lecturer on English literature and the Orient. In 1901, during a visit to India and Ceylon, he received special attention from the Parsees, who presented to Columbia a valuable collection of Zoroastrian manuscripts in recognition of the instruction there given by him in their ancient texts. In 1903 he made a second journey to the Orient, this time visiting Iran. He also visited Central Asia sometime before 1918.

Jackson's grammar of Avestan, the language used in the Zoroastrian scriptures, is still considered to be the seminal work on the topic. Jackson was one of the directors of the American Oriental Society.

He died on August 8, 1937.

Publications
 A Hymn of Zoroaster (1888)
 An Avesta Grammar in Comparison with Sanskrit (1892)
 An Avesta Reader (1893)
 Avesta, the Bible of Zoroaster (1893)
 Zoroaster, the Prophet of Ancient Iran (1898)
 Die iranische Religion (1900)
 Persia, Past and Present (1906)
 Descriptive Catalogue of the Persian MSS. in the Metropolitan Museum of Art’ (1913)
 From Constantinople to the Home of Omar Khayyam (1911)
 A Descriptive Catalogue of the Persian Manuscripts Presented to the Metropolitan Museum of Art by A. S. Cochran (1914), with A. Yohannan
 Early Persian Poetry (1920)
  (Editor). Full text online at ibiblio.org (All nine volumes in HTML form, complete, chapter-by-chapter, with all illustrations, footnotes and a combined index)
He made many contributions to the Journal of the American Oriental Society.

He edited the Columbia University Indo-Iranian Series (13 vols., New York, 1901–32).

References

Sources
New General Catalog of Old Books and Authors

External links

 Abraham Valentine Williams Jackson: biog and 4 source texts, on Vohuman.Org
 
 

1937 deaths
1862 births
Linguists from the United States
American translators
Columbia College (New York) alumni
Columbia University faculty
Historical linguists
University of Halle alumni
Iranologists
American expatriates in Germany